Silver Lily of the Valley is a 2000 Russian tragicomedy film directed by Tigran Keosayan.

Plot 
The film tells about a young girl Zoya Misochkina, who meets two producers, which radically changed her life and she embarked on the path of a new pop star.

Cast 
 Olesya Zheleznyak as Zoya Misochkina
 Yuri Stoyanov as Stas Pridorozhny
 Aleksandr Tsekalo as Lev Bolotov
 Alyona Khmelnitskaya as Irma
 Vladimir Ilyin as Misochkin
 Valery Garkalin as Kromin
 Daniil Belykh as Lyudvig
 Olesya Sudzilovskaya as blonde
 Viktoriya Tolstoganova as girl
 Georgy Martirosyan as pilot
 Avangard Leontiev as episode
 Tigran Keosayan as a visitor in the club
 Sergey Amoralov as cameo

References

External links 
 

2000 films
2000s Russian-language films
Russian musical comedy films
2000s musical comedy films